Vallejo may refer to:

Places
Vallejo, California, United States, named after Mariano Guadalupe Vallejo
Vallejo Estate, Sonoma, California, a house and grounds on the National Register of Historic Places
Vallejo Flour Mill, Fremont, California, a California Historical Landmark
Estadio de Vallejo, Valencia, Spain, a now closed stadium
Vallejo metro station (Spanish: Estación Vallejo), a station along Line 6 of the Mexico City Metro

Ships
USS Vallejo, several ships of the United States Navy
 Vallejo (ferry), an 1879 houseboat and former ferry

Other uses
Vallejo (surname), including a list of people with the name
Vallejo (band), a rock band based in Austin, Texas
Vallejo (album)

See also
Vallejos (disambiguation)
Valeo (disambiguation)